CodeBase is the largest UK technology business incubator.  It focuses on supporting technology start-ups and transforming them into bigger companies  and has supported over 500 start-ups.  Based in Scotland, it opened in Edinburgh in 2014,  but now has hubs in Edinburgh, Aberdeen, and Stirling.      Since 2017 it has been a partner in the Barclays Bank Eagle Labs network, providing business mentorship support for 26 hubs across the UK.  CodeBase also provides policy advice on the technology industry to the UK Government.  Since 2019 CodeBase has been providing the Creative Bridge programme which aims to help those in the creative industries in Edinburgh to develop new digital products and services.  

By March 2022 the companies supported by CodeBase had raised more than $4.8bn in funding.

Partnerships 

CodeBase has supported various companies including FanDuel, Cloudsoft, Administrate, Deliveroo, TV Squared, Outplay Entertainment, Rightscale, Speech Graphics, Square, and Skyscanner.

References

External links 
 

Business organisations based in the United Kingdom